Glanerbrug [ɣlaːnər'brʏx] is a town in the east of the city of Enschede, Netherlands. It is close to the border, formed by the stream Glanerbeek, with Germany and the city of Gronau, North Rhine-Westphalia. The name of Glanerbrug is derived from the bridge over the Glanerbeek (brug in Dutch is bridge in English).

On 7 April 1990 the  fell through the roof of a house there. Further information: .

Transportation
Railway Station: Glanerbrug

Born in Glanerbrug
 (born 1985), chess player
Erik Dijkstra, (born 1977), journalist and TV presenter
Nick Hengelman (born 1989), footballer
Hennie Hollink (born 1931), footballer and football manager
Rob Groener (born 1945), footballer and football manager
Bert Schierbeek (1918–1996), writer
 (born 1995), reporter

References

External links

glanerbrug.info

Populated places in Overijssel
Twente
Enschede